Blood, Sweat & 3 Years is the fourth studio album by American electronic music group Cash Cash, released on June 24, 2016 by Big Beat Records and Atlantic Records. It is their first full-length album since signing to Big Beat, following the release of the Overtime and Lightning EPs. Blood, Sweat & 3 Years includes collaborations with singers Anjulie, Bebe Rexha, Chrish, Christina Perri, Dev, Jacquie Lee, Jenna Andrews, John Rzeznik from the Goo Goo Dolls, Julia Michaels, Michael Fitzpatrick of Fitz and the Tantrums, Neon Hitch, and Sofia Reyes; rappers B.o.B, Busta Rhymes, Nelly, and Trinidad James; DJ Digital Farm Animals; and groups Little Daylight and Night Terrors of 1927.

Background and composition
On April 28, 2016, the group announced the track listing and release date for Blood, Sweat & 3 Years. The album was produced by the group themselves and Digital Farm Animals. The album took 36 months to complete. Jean Paul Makhlouf spoke about the long process of finishing the album.

The title of the album comes from a representation of the last three years of the groups lives. Following the release of the album, the group embarked on a 2016 headlining tour called Must Be the Money Tour.

Singles
"Take Me Home", featuring guest vocals from singer Bebe Rexha, was released on July 15, 2013, originally from the band's 2013 EP Overtime. It was later included on Blood, Sweat & 3 Years as its first single. It reached number 57 on the Billboard Hot 100 selling 488,000 downloads, becoming their first (and, to date, only) charting single in the US. It also reached number 6 on the Dance/Electronic Songs chart. It also peaked within the top ten in Australia and the UK. The music video premiered on December 18, 2013. "Lightning", featuring guest vocals from Goo Goo Dolls frontman John Rzeznik, was released on March 24, 2014. It was originally from the band's 2014 EP Lightning, but was later included as the second single from Blood, Sweat & 3 Years. Unlike "Take Me Home", "Lightning" did not chart. The lyric video premiered on August 11, 2014. "Surrender", featuring uncredited guest vocals from singer and songwriter Julia Michaels, was released on September 16, 2014 as the third single from the album. Although it did not chart on the Hot 100, it did reach number 19 on the Dance/Electronic Songs chart. The music video premiered on January 15, 2015. 

"Devil", featuring guest vocals from rappers Busta Rhymes and B.o.B and singer Neon Hitch, was released on August 7, 2015 as the album's fourth single. It reached number 28 on the Dance/Electronic songs chart, and number 110 in the UK. "Escarole" was released on December 11, 2015 as the album's fifth single. 

"Aftershock", featuring guest vocals from singer Jacquie Lee, was released on January 29, 2016 as the album's sixth single. The music video premiered on March 16, 2016. "How to Love", featuring guest vocals from Mexican singer Sofia Reyes, was released on April 29, 2016 as the album's seventh single. It peaked at number 16 on the Dance/Electronic Songs chart. The music video premiered on the same day. "Millionaire", their collaboration with British DJ Digital Farm Animals, featuring guest vocals from rapper Nelly, was released on June 3, 2016 as the album's eighth single. It debuted at number 22 on the Dance/Electronic Songs chart. The music video was released on June 27, 2016. "Broken Drum", featuring guest vocals from Michael Fitzpatrick of Fitz and the Tantrums, was released on June 17, 2016 as the album's ninth single, accompanied by a music video.

Critical reception

Alexendra Blair from Dancing Astronaut wrote that Cash Cash have "delivered a quality pop music release on which any song could be a confetti-drenched closer" by praising their track production and the appearance of quality collaborators such as Christina Perri and  Michael Fitzpatrick of Fitz and the Tantrums. She then criticised Nelly's performance on "Millionaire" by describing it as a "whitewashing of the rapper's sometimes gritty and often wryly wrought vocal style" and felt that "Devil" was "hollow with a sanitized inauthenticity" despite strong verses from B.o.B and Busta Rhymes. AllMusic's Neil Z. Yeung gave the album a 4/5 rating and stated that it was a "celebration of the many facets of dance in the 2010s EDM era, from trap to tropical and everything in between". He complimented their "impressive list of guests for the effort" and said that the brightest moments of the record came courtesy of the female vocalists, who bring a "carefree and breezy energy to balance the machismo". Connor Jones from We Got This Covered felt like the album "plays more like a loose collection of songs than a cohesive whole", due to some tracks being released back in 2013 which causes them to feel mismatched when listened to. He continued by stating that the record feels repetitious and formulaic regarding its female led vocal collaborations, even with the presence of many excellent tracks. The critic concluded by writing that tracks like "How To Love" which "strike the right balance between radio friendly pop and crowd pleasing dance rhythms" works best in Blood, Sweat & 3 Years, and praised the "crystal clear mixing" and "excellent synth work" on the record.

Daniel Patrin of Renowned For Sound granted the record a 2/5 rating and stated that it consisted of "calculable, artificial pop music with forced momentum", mimicking the works of Afrojack and Swedish House Mafia which made it lack "any real aspects of individualism".

Track listing
All tracks produced by Cash Cash, except "Millionaire" produced by Cash Cash and Digital Farm Animals.

Personnel
Credits for Blood, Sweat & 3 Years adapted from AllMusic.

Cash Cash
 Samuel Frisch – composer, DJ, mastering, mixing, producer, programming
 Alex Makhlouf – composer, keyboards, mastering, mixing, producer, programming
 Jean Paul Makhlouf – composer, mastering, mixing, producer, programming, vocals

Additional musicians
 Jenna Andrews – composer, featured artist
 Anjulie – featured artist
 B.o.B – featured artist
 Busta Rhymes – featured artist
 Dev & Chrish – composer, featured artist
 Fitz and the Tantrums – featured artist
 Leah Haywood – backing vocals
 Neon Hitch – composer, featured artist
 Trinidad James – featured artist
 Jacquie Lee – featured artist
 Little Daylight – featured artist
 Nelly – featured artist
 Night Terrors of 1927 – featured artist
 Christina Perri – composer, featured artist
 Bebe Rexha – composer, featured artist
 Sofia Reyes – featured artist
 John Rzeznik – composer, featured artist

Production
 Erin Beck – composer
 El DeBarge – composer
 Jennifer Decilveo – composer
 Digital Farm Animals – producer
 Jay E – composer
 Michael Fitzpatrick – composer
 Nick Gale – composer
 Jarrod Gorbel – composer
 Etterlene Jordan – composer
 Ilsey Juber – composer
 Matthew Lewkowicz – composer
 Brandon Lowry – composer
 Tal Meltzer – composer
 Julia Michaels – composer
 Ashton Parson – composer
 Jonas Philip Patterson – composer
 Lindy Robbins – composer
 Trevor Smith – composer
 Nikki Taylor – composer
 Lavell Webb – composer
 Linus Wiklund – composer
 Nicholaus Williams – composer
 Eric Zeiler – composer

Charts

Certifications

Release history

References

2016 albums
Cash Cash albums
Atlantic Records albums
Big Beat Records (American record label) albums